Rashid Barba'a (born 1952) is a Yemeni politician who served as Minister of Oil and Mineral Resources from 2001 to 2006.

Education 
Rashid was born in 1952 in Hadhramout Governorate. He obtained a master's degree in oil and chemistry, USSR, and then a PhD in 1987 in Moscow.

References 

1952 births
21st-century Yemeni politicians
Oil and mineral ministers of Yemen
People from Hadhramaut Governorate
Living people